is a Japanese female artistic gymnast. She is the 2015 Asian team and all-around champion and uneven bars and floor exercise silver medalist. She is also the 2019 Summer Universiade champion with the team and silver medalist on the floor exercise. She represented Japan at the 2016 and 2020 Olympic Games.

Junior career 
Sugihara made her international debut at the 2013 City of Jesolo Trophy and placed thirteenth in the all-around. Then at the 2013 All-Japan Championships, she finished eighth in the all-around. She then finished eleventh in the all-around at the 2013 NHK Trophy. Then at the 2013 All-Japan Event Championships, she finished fourth on the vault and eighth on the floor exercise. She then competed at the 2013 Junior Japan International where she placed eighth on the vault and sixth on the floor exercise. At the 2014 All-Japan Championships, she finished sixteenth in the all-around. Then at the 2014 NHK Cup, she finished twelfth in the all-around.

Senior career

2015 
Sugihara won the bronze medal in the all-around at the All-Japan Championships behind Asuka Teramoto and Yuki Uchiyama. She then won the all-around at the NHK Cup and was named to compete at the World Championships. At the All-Japan Event Championships, she finished eighth on the uneven bars and won the bronze medal on the balance beam and the silver medal on the floor exercise. She was selected to compete at the Asian Championships in Hiroshima alongside Natsumi Sasada, Asuka Teramoto, Sakura Yumoto, Yuki Uchiyama, and Sae Miyakawa, and they won the team gold medal. Individually, Sugihara won the gold medal in the all-around with a total score of 58.050. In the event finals, she won the silver medal on the uneven bars behind Zhu Xiaofang and on the floor exercise behind Wang Yan. She then competed at the World Championships alongside Asuka Teramoto, Mai Murakami, Sae Miyakawa, Sakura Yumoto, and Natsumi Sasada, and they finished fifth in the team final.

2016 
Sugihara won the bronze medal in the all-around at the All-Japan Championships. She also won the bronze medal in the all-around at the NHK Cup behind Asuka Teramoto and Mai Murakami, and she was named to the seven-person Olympic training squad from whom the final team of five would be selected. Then at the All-Japan Event Championships, she won the silver medals on the uneven bars and the balance beam. She was selected to represent Japan at the 2016 Summer Olympics alongside Sae Miyakawa, Mai Murakami, Asuka Teramoto, and Yuki Uchiyama, and they finished fourth in the team final. After the Olympics, she competed at the Toyota International and won the silver medals on the uneven bars and on the floor exercise, and she finished fourth on the balance beam.

2017 
At the All-Japan Championships, Sugihara won the silver medal in the all-around behind Mai Murakami. She then won another all-around silver medal at the NHK Trophy. Then at the All-Japan Event Championships, she finished fourth on the uneven bars and fifth on the floor exercise. She then competed at the World Championships in Montreal where she finished sixth in the all-around final. Then at the Toyota International, she finished ninth on the balance beam and won the silver medal on the floor exercise behind Mai Murakami.

2018 
Sugihara finished sixth in the all-around at the Tokyo World Cup. She then finished fourth in the all-around at the All-Japan Championships and at the NHK Cup. She withdrew from the World Championships due to a back injury. She returned to competition at the Toyota International and won the silver medal on the floor exercise behind Asuka Teramoto.

2019 
Sugihara finished fourth in the all-around at the Tokyo World Cup. She then competed at the All-Japan Championships and finished fifth in the all-around. She then finished fourth at the NHK Cup and was selected to compete at the World Championships. Then at the All-Japan Event Championships, she placed sixth on the balance beam and won the silver medal on the floor exercise behind Asuka Teramoto. At the Summer Universiade, she won the team gold medal alongside Teramoto and Hitomi Hatakeda. She finished fourth in the all-around final with a total score of 52.450, and she also finished fourth in the balance beam final. In the floor exercise final, she scored 13.000 and won the silver medal behind Italian gymnast Carlotta Ferlito. She then competed at the World Championships alongside Hitomi Hatakeda, Nagi Kajita, Akari Matsumura, and Asuka Teramoto, and they finished eleventh in the qualification round which earned Japan a team spot for the 2020 Olympic Games. After the World Championships, she competed at the Toyota International where she finished sixth on the balance beam.

2020-2021 
The 2020 All-Japan Championships were postponed until December due to the COVID-19 pandemic in Japan, and Sugihara finished eighth in the all-around. Then at the 2021 All-Japan Championships, she finished fourth in the all-around. At the 2021 NHK Trophy, she once again finished fourth in the all-around and was named to Japan's 2020 Olympic team alongside Hitomi Hatakeda, Mai Murakami, and Yuna Hiraiwa. Then at the All-Japan Event Championships, she won the silver medal on the balance beam behind Murakami, and she won the gold medal on the floor exercise. Then at the postponed 2020 Olympic Games, she helped Japan finish fifth in the team final, contributing scores on vault, uneven bars, and floor exercise.

Eponymous skill 
Sugihara has one eponymous skill listed in the Code of Points.

Competitive history

References

External links
 
 

1999 births
Living people
Japanese female artistic gymnasts
People from Higashiōsaka
Gymnasts at the 2016 Summer Olympics
Olympic gymnasts of Japan
Originators of elements in artistic gymnastics
Universiade medalists in gymnastics
Universiade gold medalists for Japan
Universiade silver medalists for Japan
Medalists at the 2019 Summer Universiade
Gymnasts at the 2020 Summer Olympics
21st-century Japanese women